Hickory Hiram is a 1918 American silent comedy film featuring Stan Laurel. It is not known whether the film currently survives.

Cast
 Stan Laurel as Hiram
 Teddy Sampson as Trixie
 Neal Burns as Neal
 Bartine Burkett

Reception
Like many American films of the time, Hickory Hiram was subject to cuts by city and state film censorship boards. For example, the Chicago Board of Censors cut all scenes of man in underwear after the screen title and the fat man bumping other man with stomach.

See also
 List of American films of 1918

References

External links

1918 films
1918 short films
1918 comedy films
American silent short films
American black-and-white films
Silent American comedy films
American comedy short films
1910s American films